Tillandsia elizabethae is a species in the genus Tillandsia. This species is endemic to Mexico.

References

elizabethae
Flora of Mexico